The Josiah Mason Jr. House is a historic house in Cambridge, Massachusetts.

Description and history 
It is a -story brick structure, three bays wide, with a side-gable roof and a single end chimney. The entrance, located in the rightmost bay, is in a recess flanked by sidelight windows. The recess is framed by a Greek Revival surround with pilasters and entablature. Built in 1831, this house is a locally rare example of late Federal style architecture with a side-hall plan. Josiah Mason was a local merchant and politician who served as Cambridge selectman and in the state legislature.

The house was listed on the National Register of Historic Places in 1982.

See also
National Register of Historic Places listings in Cambridge, Massachusetts

References

Houses completed in 1831
Houses on the National Register of Historic Places in Cambridge, Massachusetts
Federal architecture in Massachusetts